Lycophidion irroratum is a species of snake in the family Lamprophiidae. It is commonly known as a Leach's wolf snake or pale wolf snake. It occurs in West Africa, Cameroon, the Central African Republic, and northern Democratic Republic of the Congo.

References

Colubrids
Snakes of Africa
Reptiles of West Africa
Reptiles of Cameroon
Reptiles of the Central African Republic
Reptiles of the Democratic Republic of the Congo
Reptiles of Nigeria
Reptiles described in 1819
Taxa named by William Elford Leach